Riaz Rahman is a Bangladesh Nationalist Party politician and the former Member of Parliament from State Minister of Foreign Affairs.

Career
Rahman served in the Foreign Service of Pakistan. He stayed in West Pakistan during the Bangladesh Liberation war in 1971. He escaped Pakistan in 1973 with his family through Afghanistan. In Afghanistan with the aid of the Indian High Commission he was able to move to Bangladesh. He joined the foreign service of Bangladesh and reached the rank of secretary of the Ministry of Foreign Affairs. He served as the Permanent Representative of Bangladesh to the United Nations from 6 January 1994 to 1996. He served as the State Minister of Foreign Affairs in the Second Khaleda Cabinet. He is an advisor to Chairperson of Bangladesh Nationalist Party and former Prime Minister, Khaleda Zia.

Attack in Gulshan
On 14 January 2015, Rahman's car was attacked and he was shot twice by 6 unknown attackers on motorcycles in Gulshan. Bangladesh Nationalist Party called a strike on the following Thursday and blamed the government for the attack. The US State Department and the European Union condemned the attack on him and asked the government to investigate to find out those responsible.

References

Bangladesh Nationalist Party politicians
Living people
State Ministers of Foreign Affairs (Bangladesh)
Year of birth missing (living people)
Urdu-speaking Bangladeshi

Permanent Representatives of Bangladesh to the United Nations